The siege of Kalmar occurred in 1611 during the Kalmar War and constituted the major part of an intensive conflict between Denmark–Norway and Sweden for control of the strategically important city of Kalmar and its castle. For centuries, Kalmar was, from a strategic point of view, considered 'to be the key to Sweden'. The country that was in charge of the city with its fortified castle would reign over the Kalmar Strait and have free access to the north, along the Swedish east coast towards Stockholm. From this southern fulcrum in Sweden, a land-based attack against Danish territory and a naval attack with the Swedish navy could have been made possible.

The battle of Kalmar occurred during the summer in the same year.

Bibliography 
 F.H. Jahn: Historie om Kalmarkrigen Köpenhamn, 1820 (in Danish)
 Axel Larsen: Kalmarkrigen: et Bidrag til de nordiske Riges Krigshistorie - efter trykte og utrykte kilder Köpenhamn, 1889 (in Danish)
 Jonas Hedborg: Kungl. artilleriet. Yngre vasatiden 1985 (in Swedish)

1611 in Sweden
Kalmar
Kalmar
Kalmar
Kalmar